This Is the Army is a 1943 American wartime musical comedy film produced by Hal B. Wallis and Jack L. Warner, and directed by Michael Curtiz, adapted from a wartime stage musical with the same name, designed to boost morale in the U.S. during World War II, directed by Ezra Stone. The screenplay by Casey Robinson and Claude Binyon was based on the 1942 Broadway musical by Irving Berlin, who also composed the film's 19 songs and broke screen protocol by singing one of them. The movie features a large ensemble cast, including George Murphy, Ronald Reagan, Joan Leslie, Alan Hale Sr. and Rosemary DeCamp, while both the stage play and film included soldiers of the U.S. Army who were actors and performers in civilian life.

Plot

In World War I, song-and-dance man Jerry Jones is drafted into the US Army, where he stages a revue called Yip Yip Yaphank. It is a rousing success, but one night during the show orders are received to leave immediately for France: instead of the finale, the troops march up the aisles through the audience, out the theater's main entrance and into a convoy of waiting trucks. Among the teary, last-minute goodbyes Jones kisses his newlywed bride Ethel farewell.

In the trenches of France, several of the soldiers in the production are killed or wounded by shrapnel from a German artillery barrage. Jones is wounded in the leg and must walk with a cane, ending his career as a dancer. Nevertheless, he is resolved to find something useful to do, especially now that he is the father of a son. Sgt. McGee and Pvt. Eddie Dibble, the troop bugler, also survive.

Twenty-five years later World War II is raging in Europe. Jerry's son Johnny enlists in the Army shortly after Pearl Harbor. He tells his sweetheart Eileen Dibble that they cannot marry until he returns, since he doesn't want to make her a widow.

Johnny reluctantly accepts an order to stage another musical, following in his father's footsteps. The show goes on tour throughout the United States and eventually plays Washington, D.C., in front of President Roosevelt. During the show it is announced that this is the last performance: the soldiers in the production have been ordered back to their combat units.

Eileen, who has joined the Red Cross auxiliary, appears backstage. During a break in the show she brings a minister and persuades Johnny that they should marry now – which they do, in the alley behind the theater, with their fathers acting as witnesses.

Cast

Production
The title of the movie is the same as the title of the stage version of the show. The movie features star appearances by Irving Berlin, Kate Smith, Frances Langford and Joe Louis as themselves. Smith's full-length rendition of Berlin's "God Bless America" is arguably the most famous cinematic rendition of the piece. Louis appears in a revue piece called "What the Well-Dressed Man in Harlem Will Wear", with James Cross (lead singer and dancer), William Wycoff (dancer in drag), Marion Brown (heavyset dancer), and a chorus of perhaps a dozen, the only spoken/sung scene that includes African-Americans. Louis also appears in two other scenes, one in a boxing match, and the second being the stage door canteen number (he did not speak in either scene).

One of the film's highlights is Irving Berlin himself singing his song "Oh! How I Hate to Get Up in the Morning", a scene borrowed from Yip! Yip! Yaphank!.

The celebrity impersonation "hamburger" sequence includes accurate spoofs of Broadway stars Jane Cowl, Lynn Fontanne, Alfred Lunt and Ethel Barrymore, and film stars Charles Boyer and Herbert Marshall.

The revue pieces also include acrobat routines, several comedy pieces, including one with Hale in drag, a magic skit, a minstrel show sketch (often removed from consumer videos and television broadcasts), and tributes to the Navy and the Air Corps.

Although the core of the movie consists of the musical numbers, the movie also contains a veneer of a plot involving the wartime love interests of both the father and the son.

Release

The movie premiered at the Warner's Earle Theater on August 12, 1943.

Box office
It grossed $9,555,586 (equal to $ today), which was donated to Army Emergency Relief.

The film earned rentals of $8,301,000 in the United States and Canada and $2,144,000 overseas for a total of $10,445,000. The film was the highest-grossing musical film of all-time until it was surpassed by White Christmas in 1954. The receipts from This Is the Army place it among the top 40 movies of all time in U.S. box office popularity, which considers both inflation and the size of the population when the movie was released.

By the mid-1970s, the movie itself fell into the public domain, occasionally airing on television to a new generation of viewers. Renewed interest in some of the actors helped those players that might have been considered down-and-out, most notably Stump and Stumpy's Jimmy Cross and Harold Cromer.

George Murphy and Ronald Reagan would run for public office in California. George Murphy served one term (1965–71) in the U.S. Senate. Ronald Reagan served two terms as Governor of California (1967–75) and then President of the United States (1981–89), with both contributing to each other's Republican campaigns.  Both men also served as the President of the Screen Actors Guild: Murphy  served as the Guild's seventh President, while Reagan would serve as both the ninth and thirteenth President. Reagan would warmly and jokingly refer to Murphy, who preceded him into politics by a couple of years, as "my John the Baptist."

Many of the soldiers who had participated in the show held reunions every five years after the end of World War II. Their tenth and final reunion (1992) was held in New York's Theater District.

Musical numbers (movie)

 "It's Your Country and My Country"
 "My Sweetie"
 "Poor Little Me"
 "We're On Our Way to France"
 "Goodbye, France"
 "God Bless America"
 "What Does He Look Like"
 "This Is The Army, Mr. Jones"
 "I'm Getting Tired So I Can Sleep"
 "Mandy"
 "Ladies of the Chorus"
 "That's What the Well Dressed Man in Harlem Will Wear"
 "How About a Cheer for the Navy"
 "I Left My Heart at the Stage Door Canteen"
 "With My Head in the Clouds/American Eagles"
 "Oh, How I Hate to Get Up in the Morning"
 "This Time"

"My British Buddy", also sung by Irving Berlin, was cut from the movie version but released on DVD. It was originally added to the British production of the musical.

Awards

The musical score was nominated and won the Oscar for Music (Scoring of a Musical Picture) (Ray Heindorf) at the 16th Annual Academy Awards. The film was also nominated in the category Best Sound (Nathan Levinson), but lost to This Land Is Mine.

See also
 Ronald Reagan filmography
Winged Victory
Call Me Mister

References

External links

 
 
 
 
 
 
 
This Is the Army is available for free viewing on YouTube
 Prologue Magazine story "Irving Berlin This Is the Army" by Laurence Bergreen

1943 films
1943 musical comedy films
American musical comedy films
Articles containing video clips
Films based on musicals
Films directed by Michael Curtiz
Films produced by Hal B. Wallis
Films scored by Irving Berlin
Films scored by Ray Heindorf
Films that won the Best Original Score Academy Award
Jukebox musical films
Pearl Harbor films
Warner Bros. films
Western Front (World War I) films
World War II films made in wartime